Richard Patrick "Richie" McPhillips (born 7 July 1957) is a Social Democratic and Labour Party (SDLP) politician from Northern Ireland. He was a Member of the Legislative Assembly (MLA) for Fermanagh and South Tyrone from the 2016 Assembly election until his defeat 10 months later at the 2017 election.

Having previously worked as an insurance broker, he was elected in the 2014 Local Council Elections to serve as a councillor for the newly established Fermanagh and Omagh District Council (amassing 1,015 first preference votes (12.9%) in the Erne East DEA).

References

External links
 Profile, bbc.co.uk; accessed 15 May 2016.

1957 births
Living people
Social Democratic and Labour Party MLAs
Northern Ireland MLAs 2016–2017
Politicians from County Fermanagh
Councillors in County Fermanagh
Councillors in County Tyrone